"Red Hands" is a song by Canadian indie rock group Walk off the Earth. It was released on November 2, 2012 as the second single from their third studio album, R.E.V.O. (2013). The song was written by group members Ryan Marshall, Gianni "Luminati" Nicassio, and Sarah Blackwood, with additional writing from its co-producer Tawgs Salter.

Following its release, the song became a commercial success in North America. It reached number 9 on the Canadian Hot 100, surpassing the chart peak of its predecessor, and also topped the Billboard Adult Alternative Songs chart in the US.

Background and writing
According to band member Gianni Luminati: "'Red Hands' is pretty open to interpretation and will mean different things to different people. When we originally wrote the song, we were thinking about taking responsibility for your actions and standing up on your own when things go wrong ... rather than blaming other people around you. Sometimes you just have to accept the circumstances that are thrown your way without pointing the finger."

Music video
The music video for "Red Hands", directed by Ellis Bahl, is shot as a one take sequence of the song in a different order with parts filmed at a higher speed and others at a lower speed so the final result would present the song in its normal order with reshuffled images of the single take. To make the sequence possible, the band members had to learn the song in the rearranged order (with parts sung backwards). Bahl states in the 'Behind the scenes' video that it took nine full takes to complete the video and only the very last take is used for the actual video. The video premiered on NPR's All Songs Considered on November 1, 2012 and was uploaded on YouTube the next day. On November 8, the unedited version of the video was also uploaded on YouTube.

On March 5, 2013, the band uploaded an alternative version of the song on YouTube, appropriately named 'Big Guitar Version', with all five band members playing an oversized guitar - found in a pawn shop like stated in the video comments - thus echoing their rendition of Gotye's "Somebody That I Used to Know" uploaded one year and two months before.

The song was performed live to close out "Blast from the Past", an episode of The Listener.

Charts

Weekly charts

Year-end charts

Certifications

References

2012 songs
2012 singles
Songs written by Tawgs Salter
Walk Off the Earth songs